Early relations between India and the Soviet Union were hostile and based on mutual suspicion. While relations were established in 1947 after India's independence, Soviet leader Joseph Stalin had a negative view of Mahatma Gandhi, the Indian National Congress, and Jawaharlal Nehru, whom he viewed as tools of the British and monopoly capitalism. Following Stalin's death relations became warmer with close cooperation between the two states. Relations ended in 1991 with the dissolution of the Soviet Union.

History

Russia had wanted to strengthen commercial, cultural and literary ties with India, and had wanted to open diplomatic office in India at least since 1860, but the then British government in India was against it. The first consulate of Russia was opened in Mumbai in November 1900. Mumbai at the time was also a comfortable stopover for Haj pilgrims from the Asian republics under Russian rule. In 1910, the consulate was moved to Kolkata. On April 12, 1947, Russia opened its Embassy in New Delhi.

A cordial relationship began in 1955 and represented the most successful of the Soviet attempts to foster closer relations with Third World countries. The relationship began with a visit by Prime Minister Jawaharlal Nehru to the Soviet Union in June 1955, and First Secretary of the Communist Party Nikita Khrushchev's return trip to India in the fall of 1955. While in India, Khrushchev announced that the Soviet Union supported Indian sovereignty over the disputed territory of the Kashmir region and over Portuguese coastal enclaves such as Goa.

The Soviet Union's strong relations with India had a negative impact on both Soviet relations with China and Indian relations with China, during the Khrushchev period. The Soviet Union declared its neutrality during the 1959 border dispute and the Sino-Indian war of October 1962, although the Chinese strongly objected. The Soviet Union gave India substantial economic and military assistance and by 1960 India had received more Soviet assistance than China had. This disparity became another point of contention in Sino-Soviet relations. In 1962 the Soviet Union agreed to transfer technology to co-produce the Mikoyan-Gurevich MiG-21 jet fighter in India, which the Soviet Union had earlier denied to China.

In 1965 the Soviet Union served successfully as a peace broker between India and Pakistan after the Indo-Pakistani War of 1965. The Soviet Premier, Alexei Kosygin, met with representatives of India and Pakistan and helped them negotiate an end to the military conflict over Kashmir.

1970s
In 1971 the former East Pakistan region initiated an effort to secede from its political union with West Pakistan. India supported the secession and, as a guarantee against possible Chinese entrance into the conflict on the side of West Pakistan, it signed with the Soviet Union the Indo-Soviet Treaty of Friendship and Cooperation in August 1971. In December, India entered the conflict and ensured the victory of the secessionists and the establishment of the new state of Bangladesh.

Relations between the Soviet Union and India did not suffer much during the right-wing Janata Party's coalition government in the late 1970s, although India did move to establish better economic and military relations with Western countries. To counter these efforts by India to diversify its relations, the Soviet Union proffered additional weaponry and economic assistance.

1980s

Despite the 1984 assassination of Prime Minister Indira Gandhi, the mainstay of cordial Indian-Soviet relations, India maintained a close relationship with the Soviet Union. Indicating the high priority of relations with the Soviet Union in Indian foreign policy, the new Indian Prime Minister, Rajiv Gandhi, visited the Soviet Union on his first state visit abroad in May 1985 and signed two long-term economic agreements with the Soviet Union. According to Rejaul Karim Laskar, a scholar of Indian foreign policy, during this visit, Rajiv Gandhi developed a personal rapport with Soviet General Secretary Mikhail Gorbachev. 

In turn, Gorbachev's first visit to a Third World state was his meeting with Rajiv Gandhi in New Delhi in late 1986. General Secretary Gorbachev unsuccessfully urged Rajiv Gandhi to help the Soviet Union set up an Asian collective security system. Gorbachev's advocacy of this proposal, which had also been made by Leonid Brezhnev, was an indication of continuing Soviet interest in using close relations with India as a means of containing China. With the improvement of Sino-Soviet relations in the late 1980s, containing China had less of a priority, but close relations with India remained important as an example of Gorbachev's new Third World policy.

See also

 Foreign relations of India
 Sino-Soviet split (1953-1989)
 Foreign relations of the Soviet Union
 India–Russia relations
 Indian Society for Cultural Co-operation and Friendship
 Friends of the Soviet Union (India, 1981)

References

 
Soviet Union
Bilateral relations of the Soviet Union
Soviet Union